The 2009 FC Bunyodkor season was the 3rd season in the Uzbek League in Uzbekistan. Bunyodkor competed in Uzbek League, Uzbekistani Cup and AFC Champions League tournaments.

Squad

Out on loan

Technical staff

Transfers

In

Loans in

Out

Loans out

Released

Competitions
Bunyodkor was present in all major competitions: Uzbek League, the AFC Champions League and the Uzbek Cup.

Uzbek League

Results

League table

Uzbekistan Cup

Final

AFC Champions League

Group stage

Knockout stage

Squad statistics

Appearances and goals

|-
|colspan="14"|Players away from Bunyodkor on loan:

|-
|colspan="14"|Players who left Bunyodkor during the season:

|}

Goal scorers

See also
List of unbeaten football club seasons

References

2009 season Top assists

External links

 Official Website 
 Championat.uz 

Bunyodkor
Sport in Tashkent
FC Bunyodkor seasons